RuralShores is an Indian rural Business process outsourcing (BPO) company. It is a BPO based in rural India with delivery centers across various Indian States.

History
RuralShores was founded in May 2008 with the objective of assimilating rural India into Knowledge economy by providing job opportunities to the rural youth of the country. Col Ravi Bhushan Gupta is the CEO of RuralShores and his co-founders include V.V. Ranganathan, C.N. Ram, R.Sujatha, Sudhakar Ram and G Srinivasan.
The phenomenon of outsourcing back office operations from the West to the lower cost destinations like India is almost a decade old story but what we are witnessing now is cascading of these back office projects to the country side. While there are close to a million people employed in the vibrant call centers of India this number gets quite insignificant when compared to the 1 billion population of India, majority of whom stay in the villages. The IT and BPO companies are now moving towards rural areas due to factors like availability of untapped talent, affordable lower estate and lower labor and operational costs.

Company
RuralShores is headquartered in Bengaluru and has set up 19 delivery centers in 8 Indian states with investments from the housing finance major HDFC and Lok Capital Venture Fund. The objective of the company is to set up one such delivery center in each of the 500 rural districts of India. As of 2011, the company has delivery centers in 19 states:

Recognition
RuralShores which was established with the objective of generating employment opportunities for the rural youth of the country is currently the market leader in the nascent rural BPO category. The company has been awarded with NASSCOM Innovation award under the start up category presented in 2009, Economic Times BPO award for being the Social Catalyst of the year in 2010.

Edison Award, USA; best BPO Organization of the Year, SINGAPORE; Asian Innovation Awards 2012, HONG KONG; Manthan Award 2012, NEW DELHI

References

External links 
 Official website

Information technology companies of India
Outsourcing companies